Maiestas acuminatus (formerly Recilia acuminatus) is a species of leafhopper from Cicadellidae family that is endemic to India. It was formerly placed within Recilia, but a 2009 revision moved it to Maiestas.

References

Maiestas
Endemic fauna of India
Hemiptera of Asia